Almont is a populated place in West Rockhill Township, Bucks County, Pennsylvania, United States, approximately one-half mile  west of Sellersville.

History
The area was settled mostly by Pennsylvania Germans in the early 1700s. Early religions were Lutheran from the Old Goshenhoppen parish, Reformed and Mennonite. In 1826 land for the first church was donated by Enos Schlichter, built and shared by the three congregations. In 1868, Jacob Schlichter became the first postmaster and named it Schlichter, the post office was later changed to Almont as well as the community. Mail is now delivered by the Sellersville Post Office.

Geography

Notable residents

 Robert Pfeifle, 3rd Mayor of Bethlehem, Pennsylvania

References

Populated places in Bucks County, Pennsylvania
Unincorporated communities in Bucks County, Pennsylvania